Interferon gamma 5' UTR regulatory elements are a family of regulatory RNAs. This family represents a pseudoknot containing stem-loop structure found in the 5' UTR of interferon-gamma mRNA. This structure is thought to be involved in translational regulation and the pseudoknot has been found to activate protein kinase R (PKR) which is known to be a translational inhibitor. Mutations in the pseudoknot structure have been found to reduce PKR activation and increase the translation of interferon-gamma.

References

External links 

Cis-regulatory RNA elements